Yaya is an urban locality (an urban-type settlement) and the administrative center of Yaysky District of Kemerovo Oblast, Russia, located on the Yaya River (Chulym's tributary),  north of Kemerovo. Population: .

History
It was founded in 1897 as the selo of Zharkovka and was granted urban-type settlement status in 1934.

Miscellaneous
Dialing code: +7 38441; postal code: 652100.

References

Urban-type settlements in Kemerovo Oblast